Adventure was an early settlement in Washington County, Utah, United States, established in 1860 by Philip Klingensmith and five other people from Iron County. They formed a small settlement as part of the cotton growing colony in the area, at a place a couple of miles up the Virgin River from Grafton. Adventure was destroyed by the Great Flood of 1862 and the settlers moved to settle on some nearby land with more space for growth and above the river floods, in what is now Rockville.

The site of Adventure is just west of Rockville, on the south side of the Virgin River, east of Grafton.

References
 Washington County Chapter, Daughters of the Utah Pioneers, " Under Dixie Sun",  1950 with 1978 Supplement.  Page 127.

External links

Ghost towns in Washington County, Utah
Populated places established in 1860
Populated places disestablished in 1862
1860 establishments in Utah Territory
Ghost towns in Utah